Twickenham is a House of Commons constituency in South-West London,  represented in the House of Commons of the UK Parliament since 2019 by Munira Wilson of the Liberal Democrats.

History

Since 1945, the boundaries of the seat have been similar to those of the abolished Municipal Borough of Twickenham.

From 1931 until 1983, Twickenham was a safe seat of the Conservative Party and from 1983 until 1997 a marginal seat for that party.

Liberal Democrat Vince Cable gained the seat during the 1997 landslide Conservative defeat and held it until 2015. The seat was one of very few in Britain that gave the Liberal Democrats a majority of votes in the 2005 and 2010 elections, being their sixth best performance nationally in 2010. Cable was Secretary of State for Business from 2010 to 2015, but unexpectedly lost his seat to the Conservative candidate Tania Mathias in the 2015 general election during the nationwide collapse in the Liberal Democrat vote.

Cable regained the seat in the 2017 snap election by a 14.8% majority and an absolute majority at 52.8% of the vote; this was the highest vote percentage for the Liberal Democrats in any constituency nationally.

The seat has in the 21st century had notably high turnouts. At the 2015 general election, it had the highest turnout in England and the fourth highest in the UK. In 2017, turnout was 79.7%, the highest for any seat in the UK, ahead of Oxford West and Abingdon gained by the same party. The seat of Twickenham has also been won by the same party as the neighbouring seat of Kingston and Surbiton in all seven elections they have been in (6 Lib Dem, 1 Conservative).

Boundaries

1918–1945: The Urban Districts of Heston and Isleworth, and Twickenham.

1945: boundaries substantially changed – losing territory in the north to form Heston and Isleworth, gaining territory from Spelthorne to the south including Hampton, Teddington, Hampton Wick, Hampton Court Park and Bushy Park

1945–1974: The Municipal Borough of Twickenham.

1974–1983: The London Borough of Richmond upon Thames wards of Central Twickenham, East Twickenham, Hampton, Hampton Hill, Hampton Wick, Heathfield, South Twickenham, Teddington, West Twickenham, and Whitton.

1983–1997: The London Borough of Richmond upon Thames wards of Central Twickenham, Hampton, Hampton Hill, Hampton Nursery, Hampton Wick, Heathfield, South Twickenham, Teddington, West Twickenham, and Whitton.

1997–2010: Central Twickenham, East Twickenham, Hampton, Hampton Hill, Hampton Nursery, Hampton Wick, Heathfield, South Twickenham, Teddington, West Twickenham, and Whitton.

2010–present: The London Borough of Richmond upon Thames wards of Fulwell and Hampton Hill, Hampton, Hampton North, Hampton Wick, Heathfield, St Margaret's and North Twickenham, South Twickenham, Teddington, Twickenham Riverside, West Twickenham, and Whitton.

The seat covers the south western half of the London Borough of Richmond, that part of the borough on the north bank of the River Thames. It chiefly contains the towns or London districts of Twickenham, Hampton, Teddington and Whitton.  Smaller sub-localities by order of commercial activity are Hampton Hill, Hampton Wick, St Margarets, Fulwell, Strawberry Hill and Hampton Court hamlet proper.  Features includes Hampton Court Palace, Bushy Park (one of the Royal Parks of London), and the Rugby Football Union's national ground, Twickenham Stadium.

History of boundaries
1918–1945
During this period the Hamptons (Hampton, Hampton Hill, Hampton Court and Hampton Wick) and Teddington were excluded from the seat, which instead contained two urban districts to the north of subsequent boundaries, Isleworth and Hounslow, an area at the time with key economic sectors of construction, brewing, warehousing and goods transportation.  As such these areas had some support for the Labour Party, who in their best result in the seat, lost the 1929 by-election in the seat by 503 votes (1.6% of the vote).

1945–date
In 1945, the area saw as an unusual corollary to its shift southwards, the swing nationally, of +11.7% (Con-to-Lab) converted in the more strongly middle-class redefined seat to a major cut in the 24% Conservative majority  swinging −15.3% to a Liberal opponent, George Granville Slack.  In February 1974 and from 1979 until seizing victory in 1997, the runner-up party became the Liberal Party or their successor, the Liberal Democrats and the ward boundaries became only slightly adjusted to reflect changes made in the borderlines made at the local level of government.

Constituency profile
As described by the boundaries, the area enjoys substantial parkland and Thameside landscapes, coupled with a variety of commuter train services to Central London including semi-fast services from Twickenham itself to London Waterloo.

Twickenham is the only constituency situated entirely within the London Borough of Richmond upon Thames and, as such, is made up completely of middle-class suburbia, similar to the neighbouring constituencies of Kingston & Surbiton, Richmond Park (both in Greater London) and Esher & Walton in Surrey. Workless claimants, registered jobseekers,  were in November 2012 significantly lower in Twickenham than the national average of 3.8%, at 1.7% of the population based on a statistical compilation by The Guardian.

Members of Parliament

Elections

Elections in the 2010s 

 

This was the second largest Lib Dem majority by percentage, after Bath and the largest by number. It was also their largest vote share at the 2019 general election.

Elections in the 2000s

Elections in the 1990s

Elections in the 1980s

Elections in the 1970s

Elections in the 1960s

Elections in the 1950s

Elections in the 1940s

Elections in the 1930s

Elections in the 1920s

Elections in the 1910s

See also
 List of parliamentary constituencies in London
 1929 Twickenham by-election
 1932 Twickenham by-election
 1934 Twickenham by-election
 1955 Twickenham by-election
 Opinion polling for the next United Kingdom general election in individual constituencies

Notes

References

Sources
Boundary Commission for England

External links 
Politics Resources (Election results from 1922 onwards)
Electoral Calculus (Election results from 1955 onwards)

Politics of the London Borough of Richmond upon Thames
Parliamentary constituencies in London
Constituencies of the Parliament of the United Kingdom established in 1918